Slovenian National Corpus FidaPLUS is the 621 million words (tokens) corpus of the Slovenian language, gathered from selected texts written in Slovenian of different genres and styles, mainly from books and newspapers. 

The FidaPLUS database is an upgrade of the older (FIDA) corpus, which was developed between 1997 and 2000, with added texts that were published up to 2006 and was the result of the applicative research project of the Faculty of Arts, Faculty of Social Sciences, both University of Ljubljana, and Jožef Stefan Institute's Department of Knowledge Technologies.

Corpus is available via a corpus manager Sketch Engine. This version FidaPLUS corpus contains Word sketches, an automatic corpus-derived overview of word's grammatical and collocational behaviour.

References

External links 
 Slovenian National Corpus website FidaPLUS

Corpora
Slovene language
Online databases
Applied linguistics
Linguistic research